FG-8205 (L-663,581) is an imidazobenzodiazepine derivative related to bretazenil, which acts as a partial agonist at GABAA receptors, with slight selectivity for the α1-containing subtype. In animal tests it has anxiolytic and anticonvulsant effects but with little sedation or ataxia produced.

See also
Benzodiazepine

References

GABAA receptor positive allosteric modulators
Imidazobenzodiazepines
Oxadiazoles
Isopropyl compounds